Marketa Šichtařová (born 29 October 1976 in Kladno) is a Czech economist, author and businesswoman. She is director of Next Finance, a consulting firm, which she founded in 2004.

Career 
Šichtařová studied Economic Policy and Financial Markets, graduating from the University of Economics in Prague. She has worked in analytical positions at Volksbank CZ. She left her position at Volksbank in 2004 to set up her own analytical and consulting company, Next Finance.

Šichtařová is also a blogger on iDNES.cz, and was named blogger of the year on the site in 2011.

In 2006 and 2007 Šichtařová served as the head of the economic advisory team of the Czech Minister of Finance, Vlastimil Tlustý.

Selected works 

 Všechno je jinak aneb Co nám neřekli o důchodech, euru a budoucnosti (Everything is different: What they did not tell us about pensions, the Euro and the future), Prague: Grada, 2011, ; with Vladimír Pikora.
 Nahá pravda aneb Co nám neřekli o našich penězích a budoucnosti (Naked Truth: What they did not tell us about our money and the future), Prague: NF Distribution, 2012 ; with Vladimír Pikora.
 Lumpové a beránci (Lump and Lambs), Prague: NF Distribution, 2014 , with Vladimír Pikora.
 Zlatý poklad (Golden Treasure), Prague: NF Distribution, 2015 , with Vladimír Pikora
 Jak to vidí Šichtařová (As Šichtařová sees it), Prague: NF Distribution, 2016 , with Vladimír Pikora.
 Robot na konci tunelu: Zpráva o podivném stavu světa a co s tím (Robot at the end of the tunnel: Report on the strange state of the world), NF Distribution, 2017, with Vladimír Pikora.

Personal life 
Šichtařová is married to the Czech economist Vladimír Pikora. They have 7 children as of April 2021.

References

External links 
 Profile on Next Finance

1976 births
21st-century Czech economists
People from Kladno
Prague University of Economics and Business alumni
Living people
Czech women economists
Tricolour Citizens' Movement politicians